The 2008–09 football season was Plymouth Argyle Football Club's 40th season in the Football League Championship, the second division of English football, and their 104th as a professional club. It officially began on 1 July 2008, and concluded on 30 June 2009, although competitive matches were only played between August and May.

The team's shirt supplier was Puma. The shirt sponsor was Ginsters.

Season summary
The club began the 2008–09 season in the Football League Championship for the fourth successive year, following a highly creditable 10th-place finish the previous year. However, this season they finished 21st in the league table, one position and five points above the relegation zone with a record of 13 wins, 12 draws, and 21 defeats from 46 games. Their leading goalscorer was Paul Gallagher with 13 goals in all competitions.

The club entered the FA Cup in the third round, where they lost 3–1 away to Premier League club Arsenal. They entered the League Cup in the first round and were eliminated away to Luton Town of League Two, losing 2–0.

Notable players to begin their careers with the Pilgrims this season included Carl Fletcher, Alan Judge, Paul Gallagher, Karl Duguid and Chris Barker. The club captain was Romain Larrieu and the team captain was Karl Duguid.

Legend

Championship

League table

Pld = Matches played; W = Matches won; D = Matches drawn; L = Matches lost; GF = Goals for; GA = Goals against; GD = Goal difference; Pts = Points

Results summary

As of games played 3 May 2009

Results by round

FA Cup

Third round

Football League Cup

First round

Squad details

Player statistics
Key

# = Squad number; Pos = Playing position; P = Number of games played; G = Number of goals scored;  = Yellow cards;  = Red cards; GK = Goalkeeper; DF = Defender; MF = Midfielder; FW = Forward

Statistics do not include minor competitions or games played for other clubs. All players who were provided a squad number during the 2008–09 season are included.

Goal scorers

Starting 11
The following players have been named in the most starting line-ups. This line-up may differ from the list of players with most appearances.

Awards

Transfers

Permanent
In

Out

Loans
In

Out

See also
Plymouth Argyle seasons

External links
PAFC – Official Club Website
P@SOTI – Fans Forum
GreensOnScreen – Dedicated Fan Website

References

Plymouth Argyle F.C. seasons
Plymouth Argyle